Lockhart v. United States, 577 U.S. ___ (2016), is a United States Supreme Court decision concerning the interpretation of a federal statute. 18 U.S.C. § 2252(b)(2) states that a defendant convicted of possessing child pornography is subject to a mandatory 10 year minimum prison sentence if they have "a prior conviction...under the laws of any State relating to aggravated sexual abuse, sexual abuse, or abusive sexual conduct involving a minor or ward." Avondale Lockhart, convicted of possession of child pornography, had a prior conviction for sexual abuse of his 53-year-old girlfriend under New York State law. He was sentenced to 10 years in prison under § 2252(b)(2). He appealed claiming that the qualifier "involving a minor or ward" applies to the whole series, making his prior conviction not trigger the sentence enhancement. In a 6-2 decision, the Supreme Court held that the phrase only modifies the final item in the series, upholding the 10 year minimum sentence imposed on Lockhart.

See also
 List of United States Supreme Court cases
 Lists of United States Supreme Court cases by volume
 List of United States Supreme Court cases by the Roberts Court

References

External links
 

United States Supreme Court cases
United States Supreme Court cases of the Roberts Court